Japonia striatula is a species of land snail first described in 1973 They are operculate, terrestrial gastropods in the family Cyclophoridae. This species is endemic to Japan.

References

Molluscs of Japan
Cyclophoridae
Gastropods described in 1973
Taxa named by Nagamichi Kuroda
Taxonomy articles created by Polbot